Helictotrichon sempervirens, the blue oat grass, is a species of flowering plant in the true grass family, Poaceae, native to central and southwest European grasslands. It is a bunchgrass often used as an ornamental grass in garden design and landscaping.

The foliage is pale green with a hint of blue. The grass blooms with pale blue-green flowers in May to August. The plant is an evergreen perennial, although with summer drought stress semi-dormancy occurs. The Latin name sempervirens literally means "immortal" but in botany means "evergreen".

This plant has gained the Royal Horticultural Society's Award of Garden Merit.

References

 Repertorium Specierum Novarum Regni Vegetabilis. Centralblatt für Sammlung und Veroffentlichung von Einzeldiagnosen neuer Pflanzen (Helictotrichon sempervirens); [Edited by Friedrich Fedde]. Berlin 45:7. 1938
 GrassBase: Helictotrichon sempervirens entry

External links

sempervirens
 Bunchgrasses of Europe
 Flora of Central Europe
 Flora of Southwestern Europe
 Garden plants of Europe